Adam Halbur is an American-born poet. He received the resident poet award from The Frost Place in 2010. His first book was POOR MANNERS and his work has been published in various journals, such as The Fourth River, Forklift, OH and Verse Wisconsin  He was a contributing poet to the anthology, Never Again: Poems about First Experiences, edited by Laure-Anne Bosselaar. He is an editor for Go North.

References

External links 
St.John's University, Department Notepad, Fall 2009.
Featured speaker and author, Rural America Writers Center, 2010
No Tells, review.
"Brown Bear's Medicine Bundle", Verse Wisconsin, Issue 109, July 2012.
"Humor Me", The Alchemist's Kitchen, June 7, 2010.

Year of birth missing (living people)
Living people
American male poets